Abolghasem Alidoust is an Iranian cleric and legal scholar and professor of Fiqh at the Research Institute for Islamic Culture and Thought. He is a recipient of the Iranian Book of the Year Award for his book titled Fiqh and Maslaha.

Works
 Fiqh and Maslaha, 2009
 Fiqh and Urf, 2005
 Fiqh and Reason, 2002
 Fiqh of New Issues, 2016
 Fiqh of Nuclear Issues, 2018
 Fiqh of Art, 2016

References

External links
 Personal Website

Living people
Academic staff of the Research Institute for Islamic Culture and Thought
Iran's Book of the Year Awards recipients
1961 births